Druon is a genus of gall wasps in the family Cynipidae. The type species is Druon protagion. Recognised species include:
 Druon alexandri 
 Druon flocculentum
 Druon fullawayi
 Druon garciamartinonae
 Druon gregori
 Druon hansoni
 Druon ignotum
 Druon laceyi
 Druon linaria
 Druon pattoni
 Druon protagion
 Druon quercusflocci
 Druon quercuslanigerum
 Druon receptum
 Druon rusticum
 Druon serretae

References

Hymenoptera genera
Cynipidae
Gall-inducing insects
Oak galls
Taxa named by Alfred Kinsey

Taxa described in 1937